Roland Frederick Tasker (28 August 1907 – 29 August 1972) was an Australian rules footballer who played with Hawthorn in the Victorian Football League (VFL).

Tasker later served in the Australian Army during World War II.

Notes

External links 

1907 births
1972 deaths
Australian rules footballers from Victoria (Australia)
Hawthorn Football Club players
Echuca Football Club players
Australian Army personnel of World War II
Military personnel from Victoria (Australia)